This is a list of episodes of the television drama series Lou Grant, a spin-off of the comedy series The Mary Tyler Moore Show.

Series overview

Episodes

Season 1 (1977–78)

Season 2 (1978–79)

Season 3 (1979–80)

Season 4 (1980–81)

Season 5 (1981–82)

External links
The Canonical Lou Grant Episode Guide

See also
List of The Mary Tyler Moore Show episodes
List of Rhoda episodes
List of Phyllis episodes

Lists of American drama television series episodes
 
The Mary Tyler Moore Show